Helen Jones is an Australian actress. She appeared in the films Bliss and Waiting. For the latter she was nominated for the 1991 AFI Award for Best Actress in a Supporting Role.

References

External links
 

Living people
Australian television actresses
Australian film actresses
Australian stage actresses